Viva! Hysteria is a concert residency by English rock band Def Leppard where the band played their 1987 album Hysteria in its entirety.

The shows on 29 and 30 March were recorded and released on Viva! Hysteria, 22 October 2013.

Concert dates
Friday 22 March 2013
Saturday 23 March 2013
Wednesday 27 March 2013
Friday 29 March 2013
Saturday 30 March 2013
Wednesday 3 April 2013
Friday 5 April 2013
Saturday 6 April 2013
Wednesday 10 April 2013
Friday 12 April 2013
Saturday 13 April 2013

Setlists

Opening setlists
All 11 nights, the band opened with a distinct setlist of mostly deep cuts. They performed as the fictitious Ded Flatbird, and dubbed themselves as "The world's greatest Def Leppard cover band."

Hysteria setlist and encore

Each night after intermission, Def Leppard came back to perform Hysteria in its entirety. This started with Phil Collen on an elevated platform playing the intro to "Women". An important note is that these were the first shows to feature the band playing the whole album front to back. Accordingly, they played the songs in a true-to-album style. Notably, "Rocket" was neither the extended (Lunar mix) nor shortened (single/visualize edit) versions which have been played on recent tours, but a 2013 vintage of the Hysteria album version of the song, while "Pour Some Sugar On Me" was played with the original "Step inside, walk this way" intro as heard on the Hysteria album. Every night, the band played the same encore of its two biggest Pyromania hits, "Rock of Ages", and "Photograph".

"Women"
"Rocket"
"Animal"
"Love Bites"
"Pour Some Sugar on Me"
"Armageddon It"
Steve Clark guitar solo from Live: In the Round, in Your Face on a screen.
"Gods Of War"
"Don't Shoot Shotgun"
"Run Riot"
"Hysteria"
"Excitable"
"Love and Affection"
Encore
"Rock of Ages"
"Photograph"

Personnel
Joe Elliott – lead vocals - Also performed as his Ded Flatbird alias "Booty Reuben"
Rick Savage – bass, backing vocals - Also performed as his Ded Flatbird alias "Fleetwood Beck"
Phil Collen – guitar, backing vocals - Also performed as his Ded Flatbird alias "Chingy Chapman"
Vivian Campbell – guitar, backing vocals - Also performed as his Ded Flatbird alias "Linkin Twain"
Rick Allen – drums - Also performed as his Ded Flatbird alias "Camp Out"

References

Def Leppard concert tours
2013 concert residencies
Concert residencies in the Las Vegas Valley
Hard Rock Hotel and Casino (Las Vegas)